Practice Plus Group is a healthcare company based in Reading, Berkshire, which is England's largest independent provider of NHS services.

History 
Practice Plus Group was founded as Care UK in 1982 and rebranded in 2020. It is owned by Bridgepoint Group.

Facilities 
Their Secondary Care service operates six hospitals, three surgical centres, two musculoskeletal services, two Urgent Treatment Centres (providing direct walk in access for the assessment and treatment of injury and illness on a no appointment basis, or with patients being referred via the NHS 111 service) and delivers ophthalmology services throughout England. Through these centres they treat 80,000 NHS patients each year. The hospitals and surgical centres cover a range of specialties, including orthopaedics, endoscopy, ophthalmology, urology, gynaecology, oral and general surgery. Most centres also offer diagnostic imaging, such as X-rays and MRI, CT and Ultrasound scans.

Practice Plus Group also offers private patient treatment at its hospitals. Its website advertises prices of up to 30% less than other private hospitals. They specialise in hip, knee and cataract surgery.

Practice Plus Group’s Integrated Urgent Care division brings together NHS 111 call centres, clinical assessment, out-of-hours service and other urgent care services. 

The company is also commissioned by NHS England to provide healthcare in over 45 prisons, from reception health checks on arrival and regular GP services, to help with substance misuse, mental health, chronic or long-term conditions, podiatry, physiotherapy and optometry.

Working with the NHS 
Practice Plus Group currently delivers more than 70 dedicated NHS services and treats over a million patients every year, meeting a wide range of healthcare needs.

They are regulated by the Care Quality Commission and use the same strict governance and accountability procedures as the NHS.

See also
Private healthcare in the United Kingdom

References

Health care companies of the United Kingdom
Health care companies established in 2019
2019 establishments in the United Kingdom
Private providers of NHS services
Companies based in Reading, Berkshire